The following locations are known as Sheep Island:

United Kingdom 
 Sheep Island, County Antrim, a townland in County Antrim, Northern Ireland
 Sheep Island, Argyll, Argyll and Bute, Scotland
 Sheep Island (England), Cumbria
 Sheep Island, Pembrokeshire, an island of Wales
 Insh Island, Slate Islands, Argyll and Bute, Scotland

United States 
 Sheep Island (Massachusetts), Massachusetts, United States
 Sheep Island (Washington), Washington, United States
 Sheep Island, an alternate name for Brooks Island, Richmond, California

Other 
 Sheep Island (Nova Scotia), Nova Scotia, Canada
 Faroe Islands, Northern Europe, Faroe can be translated to 'sheep'.